Wirecast is a live video streaming production tool by Telestream. It allows users to create live or on-demand broadcasts for the web.

Wirecast is a software video switcher, controlling real-time switching between multiple live video cameras, while dynamically mixing in other source media, such as QuickTime movies, music, audio and slides to create professional broadcast productions for live or on-demand distribution on the web.

Specifications 
Can broadcast to multiple services at once
Support for multiple cameras
Chroma key (blue/green screen)
Scene transitions
Built-in lower-third titling
Desktop Presenter - makes Macintosh or Windows Desktop available as a source
H.264
3D Graphics
QuickTime Streaming Server Support
Keynote Integration
Multiple Layers
Multiple Broadcast Support, when ready to go live, it provides direct integration with a number of streaming service providers.
A direct integration with Limelight Networks, adds support for Flash streaming
Adds a built-in streaming service access from Ustream.
Encoding support for Nvidia NVENC and Intel Quick Sync Video
Support for Network Device Interface
Rendezvous Videoconferencing feature allows users to bring in live video feeds from multiple sources, including remote locations.

References

External links
 

Streaming media systems
Classic Mac OS software
Windows multimedia software
MacOS multimedia software
Livestreaming software